Richard Mandell (born November 7, 1968) is a noted golf course architect residing in Pinehurst, North Carolina.

He was born in Rye, New York, in the midst of some of the most historic golf courses in the country, such as Bethpage State Park (his all-time favorite is the Black Course), Westchester Country Club, and Winged Foot.  Sneaking onto some of the most renowned courses in the United States, Richard fell in love with the golden age architects and the impressions they left on the land.  Architects such as A. W. Tillinghast, Donald Ross, Charles B. McDonald, and Seth Raynor inspired him through books, drawings and the courses they designed (which he was fortunate enough to play on occasion).

After receiving his Bachelor of Landscape Architecture degree from the University of Georgia, Richard went to work for golf course architect Dan Maples in Pinehurst, North Carolina in 1990.  The Maples family was well rooted in the world of golf course architecture.  Frank Maples (Dan’s grandfather) was the construction superintendent for Donald Ross on the first four courses at the famed Pinehurst Country Club and Dan’s father was a golf architect in his own right, apprenticing under Mr. Ross himself.  After completing his time with Dan Maples, Richard moved on to work with Denis Griffiths, another well known architect based in Braselton, Georgia.  Working under two of the industry’s most respected architects, both of whom were past Presidents of the American Society of Golf Course Architects, provided Richard with the technical skills required to start his own legacy.

Whole In One Design Group, Inc. was founded in 1993 by Richard Mandell and three civil engineers from Easton, Maryland.  By 1999, Richard bought out his partners and changed the firm name to Richard Mandell Golf Architecture.  He based his firm in the village considered by many as the Home of American Golf:  Pinehurst, North Carolina.  For the past two decades, Richard has been involved with the design or redesign of over 35 courses throughout the world.

Richard Mandell is also a noted golf historian and author.  He recently published the book, Pinehurst ~ Home of American Golf (The Evolution of a Legend), a work that recounts the history and development of one of the most celebrated golf areas in the United States.  He has also contributed chapters to Golf Architecture: A Worldwide Perspective (both volumes 1 and 2) as well as Favourite Holes By Design (where he describes the fourth at Bethpage Black).  Richard has penned numerous articles for magazines such as Links Magazine, Golf Illustrated, and Golf Course Architecture.  Since 1997, Richard has taught a class on golf course architecture at North Carolina State University. Richard also writes a Golf Blog for The Washington Times called Golf Today: Players, Events and Fields, where he discusses everything from PGA Tournament venues to Golf in China.

Courses

 Army Navy Country Club - Arlington, Virginia
 Blue Heron Golf Club - Stevensville, Maryland
 Bobby Jones Golf Course - Florida
 Country Club of North Carolina (Practice Facility) - Pinehurst, North Carolina
 Creekside Golf & Country Club - Atlanta, Georgia
 The Easton Club - Easton, Maryland
 Erie Golf Course - Erie, Pennsylvania
 Highland Country Club (Donald Ross Original) - Fayetteville, North Carolina
 Jamestown Park Golf Club - Jamestown Park, North Carolina
 Monroe Country Club (Donald Ross Original) - Monroe, South Carolina
 Orangeburg Country Club (Ellis Maples Original) - Orangeburg, South Carolina
 Raleigh Country Club (Donald Ross Original) - Raleigh, North Carolina
 Seaford Golf & Country Club - Seaford, Maryland
 Skydoor Golf Club - Zhangjiajie, Hunan Province, China
 The Reserve Golf Club - Pawleys Island, South Carolina
 The Water's Edge Country Club - Penhook, Virginia

Awards and recognition
 1996 DuPont North American Safety, Health & Environment Excellence Award given to Seaford Golf & Country Club, Seaford, Maryland.
 Golf Digest - Voted Creekside Golf & Country Club, Atlanta Georgia - "Best New Course Nominee 2000".
 Golf Range Magazine - Voted Blue Heron Golf Course in Stevensville, Maryland - "One of the Top 10 Short Courses in America 2006".
 International Network of Golf - Awarded Pinehurst ~ Home of American Golf (The Evolution of a Legend) Book of the Year 2007. Pinehurst Book
 2009 Builders Excellence Legacy Award: Renovation of the Year
 2009 GolfInc. Private Course Renovation of the Year Runner-up

External links
Richard Mandell Golf Architecture
GolfClubAtlas.com
SymposiumOnAffordableGolf.com
Washington Times Blog
American Society of Golf Course Architects profile

References

Golf course architects
American landscape architects
University of Georgia alumni
Living people
1968 births
People from Rye, New York
People from Pinehurst, North Carolina